Sarabbagh (also Romanized as Sarābbāgh and Sarāb Bāgh) is a city in and capital of Sarab Bagh District, in Abdanan County, Ilam Province, Iran. At the 2006 census, its population was 2,273, in 458 families.

Sarabbagh is populated by Kurds.

References

Populated places in Abdanan County

Cities in Ilam Province

Kurdish settlements in Ilam Province